Riki Gal (born July 7, 1950, in Jerusalem) is an Israeli singer. Gal, who reached the height of her career in the 1980s, sings a mix of blues, folk and pop.

Biography
Rivka Menashe (later Riki Gal) was born in 1950 to an Orthodox family in the poor neighborhood of Mea Shearim in Jerusalem. In her early years, Gal experienced a hard childhood: her parents divorced when she was two years old and she was taken to an institution in Kfar Saba along with her brother Menachem
. Her mother was then able to raise the children on her own, but later could not afford the cost of growth, so she handed her children over to the nuns who raised them with strict discipline.

In 1968, at the age of seventeen, Gal was drafted into the navy, where she began her music career. After completing her military service in 1971, she married Yisrael Poliakov of the HaGashash HaHiver trio. The couple divorced in 1975. Following the divorce, Gal flew to New York, where she got married the second time. This marriage also ended in a divorce. Subsequently, Gal returned to Israel. From 1990 to 2002, she was married to the news reporter of Channel 1 Ori Cohen Aharonov. In 1991, they had a daughter named Leary.

Music career
Gal began her music career in the entertainment troupe of the Israeli Navy. After her discharge from the IDF, she released her first single and an album called World of Jacques Brel. She has collaborated with Matti Caspi, Ehud Manor and Louie Lahav. She played Mama Morton in the Beit Lessin Theater production of Chicago and was a judge on Israel's version of A Star is Born, Kokhav Nolad. She was one of the stars of Les Miserables, a musical by Alain Boublil based on the Victor Hugo novel. In 1989 she headlined the Israeli production of Evita, also starring Eli Gornstein and Viki Tavor.

Gal's album  (I love you more) was a co-production with Matti Caspi, who was responsible for most of the compositions, arrangements and instrumental accompaniment.

The title song of Gal's album Seeing the Years (2009) is "Imazman," a tribute to Gal's mother and also a play on words (ima = mom, zman = time, im hazman =  over time). The song begins with words from the popular song "Que Sera, Sera" (Whatever Will Be, Will Be) and continues in Spanish.

Dubbing Roles
The Hunchback of Notre Dame - Esmeralda (Hebrew dub)

See also
Music of Israel

References

1950 births
Living people
People from Jerusalem
20th-century Israeli women singers
Israeli rock singers
Israeli military musicians